Littleton Public Schools (aka Arapahoe County School District No. 6 or LPS) is a school district in Littleton, Colorado which serves several communities within the southern Denver metropolitan area. It is governed by a five-member Board of Education, and administered by a superintendent and six executives. Its headquarters, the Education Services Center, is located in Downtown Littleton. It is the fifteenth largest school district in Colorado. LPS operates 11 elementary schools, four middle schools, three high schools, several alternative programs, a preschool, and two charter schools.

History

In 1889, Littleton Public Schools (then Littleton School District Six) was officially incorporated with the State of Colorado. It was established in the fall of 1864 when residents of the South Platte Valley voted to establish a public school district, the boundaries of which extended from what is now Sheridan Boulevard thirty miles east to the Kansas territorial line. The first president of the school district was Lewis B. Ames. In the winter of 1864, construction of the first school, a log cabin, was completed. In 1868, Littleton's second school, a frame building, was erected on the Lilley Ranch west of the Platte River. In 1873 the Rapp Avenue School was built, a one-room, brick structure with one teacher and 70 students. Littleton Public Schools then grew exponentially, experiencing the most growth during the "baby boom" era. Most LPS schools were built between 1950 and the late 1970s.

Boundary
Within Arapahoe County, the district includes the majority of Littleton, all of Columbine Valley, and portions of Bow Mar, Centennial, Columbine, Englewood, and Greenwood Village.

Schools

Elementary schools

Carl Sandburg Elementary School
Centennial Academy of Fine Arts Education
Dr. Justina Ford Elementary
Damon Runyon Elementary School
East Elementary School
Eugene Field International Baccalaureate Elementary School 
Gudy Gaskill Elementary School
Laura Ingalls Wilder Elementary School
Little Raven Elementary School (opens fall 2023)
Lois Lenski Elementary School
Mark Hopkins Elementary School
Ralph Moody Elementary School
The Village for Early Childhood Education (preschool; students aged 3–5)
The Village at Highland Early Childhood Education Center (preschool; students aged 3–5)

Middle schools

There are four traditional middle schools in Littleton Public Schools and one alternative middle school, serving grades six through eight:

Euclid Middle School
Goddard Middle School
Isaac Newton Middle School
John Wesley Powell Middle School

High schools

Arapahoe High School

Heritage High School 

Littleton High School

Charter schools

Littleton Academy Public Charter School
Littleton Preparatory Charter School

Alternative programs

Options Secondary Program
Phoenix Program
LPS Voyager
EPIC Campus
Next Program
Nova Center
RMSEL
Transition Services

Achievements

LPS is the only school district in the Denver Metro Area that has been "Accredited With Distinction" by the Colorado Department of Education eight times. It is one of very few school districts to have maintained this level of accreditation since the inception of this rating system. All three LPS high schools have been featured in US News "Best High Schools", Newsweek magazine’s "Top High Schools in America" and 528 magazine’s "Top High Schools in Denver." LPS has the lowest dropout rate and highest graduation rate of any school district in the Denver Metro Area. In 2013, Security Magazine ranked LPS 11th best in the nation for school security.

References

External links

School districts in Colorado
Littleton, Colorado
Englewood, Colorado
Education in Arapahoe County, Colorado
1889 establishments in Colorado
School districts established in 1889